HNLMS K 2 may refer to one of three ships of the Royal Netherlands Navy named K 2 or K II:

  (1919), a unique submarine
 ,  sloop, captured by the Germans and commissioned in to the Kriegsmarine

Royal Netherlands Navy ship names